Brian Miles Reader (born May 24, 1989) is a former American football quarterback. He was signed by the Iowa Barnstormers as an undrafted free agent in 2013. He played college football at University of Idaho.

College career

Arkansas and JuCo
Reader began his college career in 2007, as a preferred walk-on for the Arkansas Razorbacks. He redshirted for the Razorbacks and ran the scout team offense. When Houston Nutt departed from Arkansas for Ole Miss, Reader decided to transfer to Monterey Peninsula College. While at Monterey Peninsula, Reader assumed the starting quarterback role, and guided the Lobos to a 10-0 regular season record and a Coast Conference championship. He was named the Coast Conference Offensive Player of the Year.

Idaho
After not landing a scholarship from any other Football Bowl Subdivision teams, Reader committed to the University of Idaho on February 5, 2009. As a sophomore in 2009, Reader was named the backup to Nathan Enderle. Reader started back-to-back games as a sophomore against Fresno State and Boise State, both losses for the Vandals.

In 2010, Reader played in 10 of the Vandals' 13 games as a backup to Enderle.

As a senior in 2011, with Enderle gone to graduation, Reader was named the Vandals starting quarterback out of fall practice. Reader started the Vandals' first eight games of the season before losing his starting position to Taylor Davis.

College career statistics

Professional career

Iowa Barnstormers
On February 3, 2013, Reader was assigned to the Iowa Barnstormers of the Arena Football League (AFL). Reader spent almost the entire the 2013 season as the backup quarterback to J. J. Raterink. It wasn't until the Barnstormers Week 17 game against the Utah Blaze, when Reader made his first career start.

Reader had his rookie option picked up by the Barnstormers in 2014, where he backed up quarterback Carson Coffman.

New Orleans VooDoo
On October 7, 2014, Reader was assigned to the New Orleans VooDoo. When starting quarterback Adam Kennedy was injured during the VooDoo's week 4 game, Reader became the starting quarterback.

References

External links
Idaho Vandals bio
Arena Football League bio

1989 births
Living people
American football quarterbacks
Monterey Peninsula Lobos football players
Idaho Vandals football players
Iowa Barnstormers players
New Orleans VooDoo players